Janine Stephens (née Hanson; December 14, 1982) is a former Canadian rower from Winnipeg on the Canadian National team. Stephens won the silver medal at the 2012 Summer Olympics in London as part of the women's eights rowing team. She also has two World Championship silver medals to her credit, also in the women's eights.

Career
Early Career

Stephens began rowing after being invited to try rowing by a former member of the National Rowing team while in a karate class in 2000. At the 2001 Canada Summer Games, she earned two bronze medals.

College Rowing

From 2002 to 2006, Stephens raced for the University of Michigan in Ann Arbour, Michigan. There, she won two Big 10 Championships and had two top five finishes at the NCAA Championships. In 2006, she was a First Team All Big 10 Honoree and won the Big 10 Sportsmanship Award.

International Rowing

Her career began as a sculler for Canada and her first major international competition came at the 2008 Summer Olympics. There, she finished in 8th place in the women's quad sculls. Stephens then transitioned to the sweep from the scull, she had not rowed in the sweeping technique since her early college days. This led to her finding success at the 2010 World Rowing Championships, she won a silver medal in the women's eight. She won the silver medal again in the women's eight 2011 World Rowing Championships. Stephens final competition was during the 2012 Olympic Games as the bow seat in the 8+. Her success in the women's eights ensured her seat at the 2012 Summer Olympics, there at the Eton Lake Rowing Centre she and then rest of the Canadian crew finished in the silver medal position behind the U.S. boat.

Coaching

Leading up to the 2017 Canada Summer Games, Stephens was announced as the head coach for the Manitoba Rowing Association. The Manitoba Team managed 1 Gold, 2 Bronze and 6 total top 5 finishes, a best ever showing for Manitoba Rowing.

In 2019, Stephens was announced as the winner of Rowing Canada's Presidents Award for her dedication to the sport of Rowing.

Personal
Stephens was born in the United States to Canadian parents, her parents returned to Winnipeg when she was two years old. She grew up in Winnipeg and trained for the national team in London, Ontario. Stephens has now retired from competitive rowing, returned to Winnipeg, and was married February 16, 2013. She has a degree in movement science from the University of Michigan. Upon retiring from competitive rowing, Stephens became the spokesperson for the Manitoba Liquor and Lotteries Commission.

Honours
In 2012 Stephens was awarded the Queen Elizabeth II Diamond Jubilee Medal.

References

External links
 

1982 births
Canadian female rowers
Olympic rowers of Canada
Rowers from London, Ontario
Rowers from Winnipeg
Rowers at the 2008 Summer Olympics
Rowers at the 2012 Summer Olympics
Living people
Olympic silver medalists for Canada
Olympic medalists in rowing
Medalists at the 2012 Summer Olympics
Canadian expatriates in the United States
University of Michigan School of Kinesiology alumni
World Rowing Championships medalists for Canada
21st-century Canadian women